Mach Railway Station is located in Mach town, Kachhi district of Balochistan province, Pakistan.

Services
The following trains stop at Mach station:

See also
 List of railway stations in Pakistan
 Pakistan Railways

References

Railway stations in Kachhi District
Railway stations on Rohri–Chaman Railway Line